Raquel Cassidy is an English actress. She played the role of Phyllis Baxter in the television series Downton Abbey (2013–2015), winning a Screen Actors Guild Award for Outstanding Performance by an Ensemble in a Drama Series. She has reprised the role for both the 2019 feature film of the same name and its 2022 sequel.

She has played leading roles in other television series including Teachers, Party Animals, Moving Wallpaper, Lead Balloon, The Worst Witch and The Good Karma Hospital.

Early life and education
Born to a Spanish mother and an English father, she was the third child and only daughter born to the couple. Born and brought up in Fleet, Hampshire, she was educated at Farnborough Hill Convent, and then Girton College, Cambridge, where she studied modern languages. She later pursued a PhD in biological anthropology, but abandoned it to pursue a career in acting.

Career
In an early role, Cassidy played Lola Chaves in an episode of The Bill, speaking predominantly in Spanish. In 2001 she took the role of Susan Gately in Teachers, returning for the second series in 2002. She has also played the Home Office Junior Minister Jo Porter in Party Animals, Cassie Turner in The Worst Week of My Life, Nancy Weeks in Moving Wallpaper and Mel in Lead Balloon.

In 2013 Cassidy joined the cast of Downton Abbey, playing the role of rehabilitated thief and ladies maid Phyllis Baxter for the show's final three series. In 2015 the cast won a Screen Actors Guild Award for Outstanding Performance by an Ensemble in a Drama Series. She reprised the role for the show's 2019 feature film, also called Downton Abbey and its 2022 sequel.

She has subsequently played the role of Miss Hardbroom in four series of the 2017 television revival of The Worst Witch. In 2022, she is appearing in series 4 of The Good Karma Hospital as Frankie Martin.

Filmography

Film

Television

Selected radio

Theatre

References

External links
 

Year of birth missing (living people)
Date of birth missing (living people)
20th-century English actresses
21st-century English actresses
Actresses from Hampshire
Alumni of Girton College, Cambridge
English Shakespearean actresses
English film actresses
English people of Irish descent
English people of Spanish descent
English radio actresses
English stage actresses
English television actresses
Living people
People educated at Farnborough Hill
People from Fleet, Hampshire